Kennan Ferguson (born September 28, 1968) is an American political theorist who writes on contemporary issues concerning pluralism and the quotidian. He is the Director of The Center for 21st Century Studies at The University of Wisconsin–Milwaukee, and co-editor of the academic political philosophy journal Theory and Event.

Research

The Politics of Everyday Life
The central focus of Ferguson’s work has been to democratize political philosophy by locating it in the practices of people. He identifies the political components of such diverse everyday aspects of life as judgment, aesthetics, and the family.  He holds that political philosophy should emerge from the actual practices of people, rather than being a set of abstract systems which they should be forced to follow.  In his investigations of the role of aesthetic judgment, pets, silence, and cookbooks in people’s lives, he shows how love, sensibility, and the ontic overlap with authority, force, and political identity.

Pluralism
Ferguson celebrates aspects of the political philosophy of pluralism, but not as it is commonly understood in political history. He refers to William James as the founder of political pluralism, but notes the “descent of pluralism” in the 20th Century from a prescriptive aspiration to a descriptive problem.

Political Science
In 2017, Ferguson criticized the discipline of political science in the United States for its "institutionally naturalized" exclusion of Native American scholars, perspectives, texts, and issues.  In response, the Native legal theorist David E. Wilkins responded that he sees "nothing on the horizon to indicate that there will be any substantive alterations in the intellectual pursuits of most political scientists anytime soon."

Criticism
The political theorist Jodi Dean has argued that Ferguson's approach to politics is "depoliticizing and accommodationist."  For Dean, Ferguson's rejection of normative unity as a goal makes politics impossible, in that political actors can rarely unite against exploitation and oppression.

Books

as author
  (Reissue of 1999 book.)

as co-editor
  – with Michael Gibbons (Editor-in-Chief), Diana Coole, and Elizabeth Ellis 
  – with Patrice Petro

References

External links
Kennan Ferguson at Google Scholar
Why Does Political Science Hate American Indians?. Cambridge University Press.

University of Hawaiʻi alumni
University of South Florida faculty
1968 births
Living people
People from Thousand Oaks, California
Amherst College alumni
American political philosophers
University of Wisconsin–Milwaukee faculty